The New York Observer was a weekly newspaper printed from 1987 to 2016, when it ceased print publication and became the online-only newspaper Observer. The media site focuses on culture, real estate, media, politics and the entertainment and publishing industries.

History
The Observer was first published in New York City on September 22, 1987, as a weekly newspaper by Arthur L. Carter, a former investment banker. The New York Observer had also been the title of an earlier weekly religious paper founded by Sidney E. Morse in 1823.

In July 2006, the paper was purchased by the American real estate figure Jared Kushner, then 25 years old. The paper began its life as a broadsheet, and was then printed in tabloid format every Wednesday, and currently has an exclusively online format. It is headquartered at 1 Whitehall Street in Manhattan.

Previous writers for the publication include Kara Bloomgarden–Smoke, Kim Velsey, Helen Holmes, Brandon Katz, Erin Taylor, Eric Vilas-Boas, Matthew Kassel, Jillian Jorgensen, Joe Conason, Doree Shafrir, Hilton Kramer, Andrew Sarris, Richard Brookhiser, Michael Tomasky, Azi Paybarah, Ross Barkan, John Heilpern, Robert Gottlieb, Foster Kamer, Nicholas von Hoffman, Simon Doonan, Anne Roiphe, Terry Golway, Ron Rosenbaum, Michael M. Thomas, Philip Weiss, and Steve Kornacki.

Originally, the paper was perhaps best known for publishing Candace Bushnell's column "Sex and the City" about Manhattan's social life, on which the television series Sex and the City is based. It was visually distinctive because of its use of sketch illustrations and salmon-colored newsprint, with the latter compared to the appearance of the Financial Times. Henry Rollins once described it as "the curiously pink newspaper". The paper switched to using white newsprint in 2014.

The fourth and longest-serving editor for the newspaper, Peter Kaplan, left the newspaper on July 1, 2009. Interim editor Tom McGeveran was replaced by Kyle Pope in 2009. Elizabeth Spiers served as editor from 2011 to 2012, followed by interim editor Aaron Gell. In January 2013, publisher Jared Kushner named his longtime friend Ken Kurson, a political consultant, journalist, and author, as the Observers next editor.

Publication of the weekly print edition ended with the November 9, 2016 issue. Observer Media, the publication's parent company, has continued to publish content on an online site under the masthead "Observer" (dropping "New York" from the name).

The discontinuation of the print Observer came the day after Kushner's father-in-law, Donald Trump (Trump's daughter Ivanka is Kushner's wife), won the 2016 presidential election; Kushner served as a senior adviser in the Trump Administration. Kushner transferred his ownership of Observer Media's remaining online assets into a family trust, through which his brother-in-law Joseph Meyer took over his former role as publisher.

Ownership

The publisher and original owner, Arthur Carter, has had other publishing interests, including the Litchfield County Times. At one time, he was a part‑owner in The East Hampton Star. Carter received a B.A. in French literature from Brown University and an M.B.A. in finance from the Tuck School of Business at Dartmouth College. He spent 25 years in investment banking until 1981, when he founded the Litchfield County Times in New Milford, Connecticut. He owned it for twenty years until selling to Journal Register Company, later also selling his 50‑percent interest in The East Hampton Star in 2003. He has been an adjunct professor of philosophy and journalism at New York University and is a trustee.

In July 2006, Jared Kushner, a 25‑year‑old law student and son of a wealthy New Jersey developer, Charles Kushner, purchased the paper for just under $10million. 

In January 2017, Jared Kushner announced he would sell his stake to a Kushner family trust, when he became a senior advisor to President Donald Trump. Kushner's brother-in-law, Joseph Meyer, who has been the CEO of Observer Media Group since 2013, replaced him as publisher.

Political stance
In 2016, the Observer became one of only a handful of newspapers to officially endorse United States presidential candidate Donald Trump in the Republican Party presidential primaries. The newspaper's owner and then publisher, Jared Kushner, is Trump's son-in-law and was an advisor to the Trump presidential campaign. The Observer did not repeat its endorsement after Trump became the Republican nominee for President.

References

External links

Newspapers published in New York City
Newspapers established in 1987
Online newspapers with defunct print editions
American news websites
1987 establishments in New York City
Publications disestablished in 2016
Weekly newspapers published in the United States